I (И и; italics: И u) is a letter used in almost all Cyrillic alphabets with the exception of Belarusian.

History
Because the Cyrillic letter І was derived from the Greek letter Eta (Η η), the Cyrillic  had the shape of  up to the 13th century.

In the Cyrillic numeral system, the Cyrillic letter І had a value of 8, corresponding to the Greek letter Eta.

In the Early Cyrillic alphabet, there was little or no distinction between the letter  and the letter , the latter of which was derived from the Greek letter Iota (Ι ι). Both remained in the alphabetical repertoire because they represented different numbers in the Cyrillic numeral system: eight and ten.

In New Church Slavonic, they co-exist with each other with no pronunciation differences. But in Ukrainian and Rusyn, the two letters have different pronunciations. Other modern orthographies for Slavic languages eliminated one of the two letters in alphabet reforms of the 19th or the 20th centuries. The Russian, Macedonian, Serbian, and Bulgarian languages use only , and Belarusian uses only .

Form
Originally, Cyrillic  had the shape identical to the capital Greek letter Eta . The middle stroke was later turned counterclockwise, which resulted in the modern form resembling a mirrored capital Latin letter N  and so  is used in faux Cyrillic typography. However, the style of the two letters is not fully identical: in roman fonts,  has heavier vertical strokes and serifs on all four corners, and  has a heavier diagonal stroke and lacks a serif on the bottom-right corner.

In roman and oblique fonts, the lowercase letter  has the same shape as the uppercase letter . In italic fonts, the lowercase letter  looks like the italic form of the lowercase Latin U . Both uppercase and lowercase handwritten forms of the Cyrillic letter I look like handwritten forms of the Latin letter U.

Usage 
Since the 1930s,  has been the tenth letter of the Russian alphabet, and in Russian, it represents , like the i in machine, except after some consonants (see below). However, unlike other "soft" vowels (and ),  in isolation is not preceded by the  semivowel. In Russian, the letter could be combined in the digraph  (like ,  and ) to represent  before it started around 1783. Apparent confusion has remained in the transcription of some foreign words.

In the Bulgarian Cyrillic alphabet  is the ninth letter. It represents the sound  and also occurs with a grave accent, ѝ, to distinguish orthographically the conjunction  ("and") and the short form of the indirect object  ("her").

In Belarusian, the letter (и) is not used at all, and the sound  is represented by the letter , which is also known as Belarusian-Ukrainian I.

The letter  is the eleventh letter of the Ukrainian alphabet and represents the sound , a separate phoneme in Ukrainian. The Ukrainian  can be transliterated to other languages that use the Cyrillic script by either  and  because of the lack of a uniform transliteration rule. The sound  in Ukrainian is represented by the letter , just as in Belarusian.

In the Serbian Cyrillic alphabet,  is the tenth letter of the alphabet. In Serbian, the letter represents , like the i in machine. In the Serbian Latin alphabet, the sound is represented by "I/i".

In Macedonian,  is the eleventh letter of the alphabet and represents the sound .

(See romanization of Russian and romanization of Ukrainian for more details.)

In Tuvan, the letter can be written as a double vowel.

Stylistic uses 

Due to its close resemblance to the Latin capital letter N, specifically as a "flipped" or "reflected" version of it, it is sometimes used stylistically as a replacement for N. This is commonly seen in Faux Cyrillic.

The industrial rock band Nine Inch Nails notably use both N and И in its logo. The hard rock band Linkin Park have also used the glyph, particularly on the cover of their debut album Hybrid Theory.

Accented forms and derived letters 
The vowel that is represented by  can, as is the case for almost any other Slavonic vowel, be stressed or unstressed. The stressed variant is sometimes (in special texts like dictionaries or to prevent ambiguity) graphically marked by the acute, grave, the double grave, or the circumflex accent.

Special Serbian texts also use  with a macron to represent long unstressed variant of the sound. Serbian  with a circumflex can be unstressed as well, which then represents the plural form of the genitive case to distinguish  from other similar forms.

Modern Church Slavonic orthography uses the smooth breathing sign (Greek and Church Slavonic: psili, Latin: spiritus lenis) above the initial vowels (for tradition alone since there is no difference in pronunciation). It can be combined with acute or grave accents if necessary.

None of those combinations is considered to be a separate letter of respective alphabet, but one of them has an individual code position in Unicode.

 with a breve forms the letter  for the consonant  or a similar semivowel, like the y in English "yes." The form has been used regularly in Church Slavonic since the 16th century, but it officially became a separate letter of alphabet only much later (in Russian in 1918). It is known similarly as I kratko in Bulgarian but as Yot in Ukrainian.

Related letters and similar characters
Η η : Greek letter Eta
H h : Latin letter H
Ι ι : Greek letter Iota
I i : Latin letter I
Й й : Cyrillic letter Short I
І і : Cyrillic letter Dotted I

Computing codes

References

External links

Vowel letters